The American Archivist is a biannual peer-reviewed academic journal and the official publication of the Society of American Archivists. It covers theoretical and practical developments in archival science, particularly in North America. The journal contains essays, case studies, perspectives, and reviews of recent books and web resources. Contents are freely available to the public, except for the six most recent issues, which are viewable only to subscribers and society members. Online supplements are published irregularly and without access restrictions. Authors retain copyright of their work and license publication to the journal; the content is licensed under a Creative Commons Attribution Non-Commercial 3.0 United States License, except where otherwise noted.

History 
The American Archivist was first published in January 1938. It appeared quarterly until 1998, when it switched to a biannual rhythm. In 2011 the journal published its first online supplement, which featured content from the Society of American Archivist's 75th annual conference. The SAA began publishing with Allen Press in 2015.

Editors 
The following persons have been editors-in-chief of the journal:

References

External links 
 

Archival science journals
Publications established in 1938
Biannual journals
English-language journals
Academic journals published by learned and professional societies of the United States
Delayed open access journals
Allen Press academic journals